South Sudan Football Championship is the top division of the South Sudan Football Association. The first season started in 2011 after the independence of South Sudan.

For the first championship in 2011, seven provincial champions entered, and the title was won by Wau Salaam. They went on to represent South Sudan in the 2012 Kagame Interclub Cup of CECAFA.

For the second championship in 2013, the title was won by Atlabara, and they have participated in the 2014 CAF Champions League.

Clubs

Source:

Champions
2011–12 – Wau Salaam
2013 – Atlabara
2014 – Al-Malakia
2015 – Atlabara
2016 – Not played
2017 – Wau Salaam
2018 – Al-Hilal Wau (appeal won by Al-Merreikh, but later overturned by South Sudan Football Association)
2019 – Atlabara
2020 – Not played due to the Covid-19 pandemic

Performance by club

References

Football leagues in South Sudan
Top level football leagues in Africa
2011 establishments in South Sudan
Sports leagues established in 2011